The Jorge Luis Hirschi Stadium, also known as Estadio Uno, is a stadium located in the city of La Plata, Argentina. With a seat capacity of 35,530, the stadium is the home field of club Estudiantes de La Plata.

Because of its technological innovations and environmental sustainability, the stadium is regarded as one of the most modern venues in Argentina. The stadium is also one of the oldest in Argentina so it was established at "Paseo del Bosque" park in 1906.

The stadium is named after Jorge Luis Hirschi, who served as Estudiantes' president between 1927 and 1932, and is located on 1st Avenue between 55th and 57th Streets. It is thus also known as 1 y 57 (referring to its location on 1 and 57 streets). It was formally inaugurated on 25 December 1907. The arena was the venue where Estudiantes obtained the 1913 amateur league title, and where fans enjoyed los profesores ("the professors"), the famous 1930s offensive line of Lauri-Scopelli-Zozaya-Ferreyra-Guayta.

In its initial incarnation (1907 to 2005) the stadium held up to 28,000 people, mostly standing-room, even though security measures would reduce its actual capacity to about 22,000. Its relatively meager size made Estudiantes use Boca Juniors' Bombonera stadium for its Copa Libertadores games.

History

Historia 

In 1906, the Estudiantes executives focused on building a venue that could be suitable for Primera División matches so it was required by the Argentine Football Association to admit club's registration with the body. It was because the original field on 19 and 51 avenues (where the Islas Malvinas Park is placed nowadays) was not in line with the requirements to host official matches. President of the club, Nazario Roberts, make the arrangements and the Government of Buenos Aires Province gave the club a land on 1 and 57 street, where a velodrome functioned. With a capacity for 2,000 spectators, the stadium was inaugurated on 25 December 1907.

After the pitch was remodelated, in 1911 a roofed grandstand was built. In 1937 a new lighting system was installed and the stadium became the first major venue in Argentina to host night games, inaugurated in a friendly match v Uruguayan side Peñarol. Those improvements allowed Estudiantes to participate in the Torneo Internacional Nocturno Rioplatense, a Summer tournament contested by Argentine and Uruguayan clubs.

The official grandstand, remodeled during the presidency of Pedro Osácar in the 1940s, was destroyed by fire in 1960 and then replaced by a roofed grandstand built entirely in concrete. It would be used until the venue's demolition in 2007.

Closure 
In September 2005, the stadium was closed down for league games because of new safety regulations that forbid wooden stands. Even though a judicial restraining order exempted Estudiantes from the prohibition, the La Plata city government refused to comply. This situation started a rift between the club and mayor Julio Alak.

When a modern stadium was built for the city of La Plata, both Estudiantes and Gimnasia y Esgrima decided against relocating their home games. Immediately after the closure, Estudiantes requested permission for upgrading its stadium to no less than 20,000 seats plus 15,000 standing room, but the mayor refused, insisting that the new stadium should be used.

As a stopgap measure, for the 2005 Apertura Estudiantes played its home games in the nearby Gimnasia stadium, and paid Gimnasia a rent of 10% gross income, plus an undisclosed amount for each attending season ticketholder. For the 2006 Clausura, Estudiantes moved its home games to the Quilmes venue, Estadio Centenario.

In April 2006, a new judicial order allowed the re-opening of 1 y 57, but Alak intervened again to avoid this from happening. At this point, Estudiantes management floated the idea of erecting a new stadium in the port town of Ensenada, a few kilometers east of La Plata.

Agreement and Future Plans

In August 2006 it was reported that Estudiantes and the city of La Plata reached an agreement to rebuild the stands for a capacity of 20,000, all seated. The city stadium will be used for attendances exceeding that number. The eastern stands will feature the signage Tierra de Campeones (Land of Champions), which was used by fans since the 1960s to refer to 1 y 57.

Player Juan Sebastián Verón was instrumental in securing the new stadium agreement. Argentine journalists have indicated that with this intervention (as well as a series of donations to upgrade the club's training facilities in City Bell) he is building his reputation towards a future bid for the club presidency.

On October 20, 2006, Estudiantes announced that, during the renovation work, it will use the city stadium for home games, as Coprosede (the football security authority) will not grant security clearance for Estudiantes to play home games in Quilmes. Estudiantes fans also became less apprehensive about the city stadium after the historic 7–0 win over Gimnasia in October 2006, and the championship celebrations that took place in the stands, two months later.

Demolition works were completed during July 2007, after some delays caused by municipal red tape. Construction is scheduled to proceed smoothly, as the club has a budget surplus resulting from strong ticket sales and the proceedings from the transfers of José Ernesto Sosa and Mariano Pavone.

The stadium will be open for the 2019–20 season.

References

External links

 
Google Maps aerial view looking North. The technical school is bottom right. Avenue 1 runs NW-SE near the stadium, and is covered by two rows of linden trees. Estudiantes' stands are to the left. East of the stadium is La Plata's bosque park. Panning right, Gimnasia's stadium becomes visible, less than 1 km to the east of Jorge Luis Hirschi Stadium.
Panoramic video of stadium taken after the 2006 championship and before the start of demolition works.
Picture of stadium

Estudiantes de La Plata
Football venues in Argentina
Proposed stadiums
Estadio Jorge Luis Hirschi
Sports venues completed in 1907
Sports venues in Buenos Aires Province
Estadio Jorge Luis Hirschi
Proposed buildings and structures in Argentina
1907 establishments in Argentina